R (Daly) v Secretary of State for the Home Department [2001] UKHL 26 is a UK constitutional law case of the House of Lords case on the rights of a prisoner when his cell is searched by prison officers.

Facts
The case concerned whether cell searches contravened a prisoner's right to private correspondence with his solicitor. The case is of importance for its use of a proportionality test in a judicial review case, a method copied from the jurisprudence of the European Convention on Human Rights.

Judgment
The prisoner's case was accepted.

References
 Helen Fenwick and Gavin Phillipson, "Text, cases & materials on public law & human rights" (2 rev ed), Routledge Cavendish, 2003,

External links
House of Lords judgment

House of Lords cases
2001 in case law
2001 in British law
Home Office litigation
United Kingdom constitutional case law